Thomas Hincks (1818 – 25 January 1899) was a British Unitarian minister and a naturalist known for his work on zoophytes and bryozoa.

Life
He was born the son of the  William Hincks in Exeter, Devon. He studied at Manchester New College from 1833 to 1839 (while it was, confusingly, in York) and received his B.A. from the University of London.

He became a Unitarian minister and served at Cork (1839), Dublin (1842), Warrington (1844), Exeter (1846), Sheffield (1852) and Leeds (1855). He lost his voice whilst at Mill Hill Chapel in Leeds, and had to resign. He retired to Clifton and studied zoophytes, especially in Devon.

He published A history of the British hydroid zoophytes (1868) and A history of the British marine Polyzoa (1880).

In June 1872, he was elected a Fellow of the Royal Society.

At least six genera and 13 species of invertebrates are named in his honour.

References

1818 births
1899 deaths
Alumni of the University of London
Clergy from Exeter
British naturalists
Fellows of the Royal Society
Scientists from Exeter